Matthew Stevens (born 11 September 1977) is a Welsh professional snooker player. He has won two of the game's Triple Crown events, the Masters in 2000 and the UK Championship in 2003. He has also been a two-time runner-up in the other triple crown event, the World Snooker Championship, in 2000 and 2005. Stevens reached a career high ranking of No. 4 for the 2005/2006 season. Stevens has compiled more than 300 century breaks during his career.

Career

Early career
Stevens became a professional snooker player in 1994; in his second season, he won the Benson & Hedges Championship to qualify for the Masters, where he beat Terry Griffiths 5–3 but lost 5–6 to Alan McManus. He also showed potential the following season by beating Stephen Hendry 5–1 in the Grand Prix. In the 1997–98 season, he reached the semi-finals of both the Grand Prix and the UK Championship, achieving the highest break of the tournament at the latter. He also reached the quarter-finals on his debut at the Crucible in the World Championship, beating Alain Robidoux and Mark King before losing to Ken Doherty. In 1998, he reached his first ranking final at the UK Championship, losing 6–10 to John Higgins.

2000–2005
In the 1999–00 season Stevens got to all three finals of the Triple Crown events. In the final of the 1999 UK Championship he lost to Mark Williams 8–10. He won the 2000 Masters title, with a 10–8 win over Ken Doherty in the final. At the 2000 World Championship, he reached the first of his two world championship finals to date. After victories over Tony Drago, Alan McManus, Jimmy White, and Joe Swail, he faced Mark Williams in the final, losing 16–18, after having led 10–6, 13–7, and then 14–10, with the final session to play. Stevens became only the second player in the history of the world championship to lose in the final from holding a four frame overnight lead. He has also been beaten in a world championship semi-final on four occasions: in 2001, 2002, 2004, and 2012. In 2002, he looked certain to have won a place in the final, leading Peter Ebdon 16–14 in their semi-final tie, and just needing a relatively simple red in the 31st frame to leave his opponent requiring snookers. When Stevens missed the pot, Ebdon made an impressive clearance to win the frame and went on to take the next two frames to win the match 17–16.

Stevens won the 2003 UK Championship, after beating Stephen Hendry in the final. He trailed Hendry 0–4 at the first interval, but remarkably he reeled off the next five frames; Hendry found his form again to lead 7–5, but Stevens was not to be denied and clinched a 10–8 victory. This remains the only ranking tournament victory of his career. However, he followed this achievement with a run of nine successive first round defeats in best-of-nine matches, only interrupted by a run to the semi-final of the 2004 World Championship.

He was again runner-up at the 2005 World Championship, losing 16–18 to Shaun Murphy in the final, having been up 10–6, and then 12–11 with only the final session to play. He again relinquished a four frame overnight lead to lose in the final, only the third time this had ever happened in world championship history. The turning point was arguably the 22nd frame, in which he had a shot at the final blue to leave Murphy needing snookers; Stevens elected to play the shot left-handed rather than use the rest and, when he missed the shot, Murphy then cleared the table to level the match at 11–11. Despite the disappointment of losing the final, Stevens insisted that Murphy had simply been the "better player" and that he would himself eventually win the championship.

The following year, Stevens was beaten by Ken Doherty 8–13 in the second round of the 2006 World Championship, having gone into the final session level at 8–8.

2006–2010
In 2007, Stevens lost 12–13 to Shaun Murphy in the quarter-finals of the World Championship, having led 11–5 and 12–7 earlier in the match, making him the first person to ever lose a best-of-25 match from a 12–7 lead. The defeat left him ranked outside the top 16 for the first time in eight years. In 2008, he was defeated in the first round of the World Championship for the first time in his career, by defending champion John Higgins, and he finished ranked outside the top 16 for the second consecutive season. The only highlight of the 2008–09 season was a run to the final of the Bahrain Championship, in which he was given a top 16 seeding due to the unavailability of three leading players. He only reached the last 16 of one other event, and failed to qualify for the World Championship after a defeat to Martin Gould. He finished the season with a drop of nine places to world number 26.

Stevens enjoyed a solid 2009–10 season. He qualified for the Welsh Open by beating Barry Pinches 5–4. In the first round, he caused an upset by defeating Shaun Murphy 5–4. He then faced Northern Ireland's Mark Allen in the second round but, despite making two century breaks, he lost the match 2–5. He also lost a close match 9–10 to Marcus Campbell in the 2010 World Championship qualifiers, and thus did not make it to the main draw at The Crucible for the second year in succession.

2010/2011
Stevens made a promising start to the 2010–11 season by qualifying for the Shanghai Masters with a 5–2 victory over Anda Zhang. In the first round, he defeated Liang Wenbo 5–3, and he caused another upset in the last 16 by beating Shaun Murphy 5–2. He played Ali Carter in the quarter-finals, but lost 4–5 on the final black despite an earlier lead of 4–1.

He continued his solid form by reaching the quarter-finals at the Welsh Open, where he qualified by defeating Anthony Hamilton 4–2. He whitewashed number 5 seed Shaun Murphy 4–0 in the last 32, and in the last 16 he beat fellow Welshman and close friend Ryan Day 4–3. Stevens was drawn against John Higgins in the quarter-finals, but was edged out 3–5. Despite these performances, he was still not ranked in the top 16, so did not automatically qualify for the World Championship; in the fifth round of qualifying, he overcame Fergal O'Brien 10–9 on the final black to qualify for the first time since 2008. He was eliminated by Mark Allen in the first round of the main draw, losing four consecutive frames after leading 9–6. He then won the 2011 Championship League, beating Mark Williams 3–1 in the semi-final, and Shaun Murphy 3–1 in the final, to qualify for the Premier League.

His performances during the season were enough to see Stevens return to the elite top 16 in the world rankings for the first time since 2006, meaning he would no longer need to play qualifying matches to reach the main stage of the ranking events.

2011/2012
After losing in the first round of the Australian Goldfields Open to Liang Wenbo, Stevens reached the quarter-finals of the Shanghai Masters by defeating Stephen Lee and Martin Gould. However, his run was ended by compatriot Mark Williams, who whitewashed him 0–5. A last 16 exit in the 2011 UK Championship to Ding Junhui followed, before Stevens reached his second ranking event quarter-final of the season in the German Masters courtesy of 5–1 victories over both Craig Steadman and Neil Robertson. He then lost to Ronnie O'Sullivan 3–5.

Due to being ranked inside the top 16, Stevens played in his first Masters tournament since 2007 during the season and was beaten by John Higgins 2–6 in the first round. His first Premier League campaign since 2002 saw Stevens win 3 and lose 3 of the 6 matches he played to finish 7th in the 10-man league and therefore fail to make it to the play-offs.
Stevens finished runner-up to O'Sullivan in Event 7 of the minor-ranking Players Tour Championship series and with last 16 finishes coming in Event 9 and Event 11, he was ranked 17th in the Order of Merit, inside the top 24 who qualified for the Finals. There he played Ricky Walden in the last 24 and lost 0–5 in 50 minutes.

Stevens was defeated in the second round of the Welsh Open and had successive first round losses in the World Open and China Open to go into the World Championship in less than auspicious form. However, Stevens had an excellent run as he reached his sixth semi-final in the event, and first since 2005. He reached the last four with wins over Marco Fu (10–3), Barry Hawkins (13–11) and Ryan Day (13–5, having won 11 consecutive frames). He played Ronnie O'Sullivan in the semi-final and lost 10–17, meaning Stevens has not beaten his opponent in almost a decade. Stevens finished the season ranked world number 10, the highest he has ended the year since 2005.

2012/2013

Stevens withdrew from the season's opening ranking event, the Wuxi Classic due to a bad back and could not advance beyond the second round in any of the next three events. At the 2012 UK Championship he beat Dominic Dale 6–1 and Marco Fu 6–4 to reach the quarter-finals for the first time since lifting the trophy in 2003. In a scrappy game versus Mark Davis, Stevens was beaten 4–6. Stevens missed a simple brown at 4–1 up against Mark Williams in the first round of the Masters and then made a series of errors during the rest of the match to lose 4–6. His second quarter-final of the season came at the German Masters, where he was defeated 3–5 by Marco Fu, before losing 2–4 to Stephen Maguire in the second round of the Welsh Open.

Stevens travelled to Haikou, China, for the World Open, but his cue failed to arrive on time for his first round match against David Gilbert. However, he beat Gilbert 5–4 with a borrowed cue and Shaun Murphy 5–3 with Mark Williams' cue before his own finally arrived for his quarter-final against Judd Trump. It was Trump this time who suffered cue troubles as his tip became damp during the match and Stevens took full advantage to triumph 5–3. He then came back from 4–5 against Neil Robertson in the semi-finals to win 6–5 and reach his first ranking event final since the 2008 Bahrain Championship. He faced Mark Allen in the final and, despite making two centuries, he was comfortably beaten 4–10. Stevens' season finished in disappointment as he lost in first round of the China Open 2–5 to Rory McLeod and 7–10 to Marco Fu in the World Championship, which saw him finish the year ranked world number 14.

2013/2014
At the season's opening ranking event, the 2013 Wuxi Classic, Stevens beat Lu Ning 5–1, Liang Wenbo and Peter Lines both 5–3, and David Morris 5–2, to advance to the semi-finals. He threatened a brief comeback against John Higgins from 0–5 down, but lost 2–6. He gained some revenge over Higgins at the International Championship by beating him 6–2, before being eliminated by Ding Junhui 1–6 in the third round. He was beaten in the last 32 of both the UK Championship (2–6 by Robert Milkins) and the German Masters (4–5 by Shaun Murphy, after Stevens had led 4–1). He also lost deciding frames in the last 32 of the Welsh Open and World Open to Joe Perry and Judd Trump respectively. He failed to qualify for the World Championship this year as he lost 8–10 to Tom Ford in the final qualifying round. Stevens dropped out of the top 16 and ended the year as world number 19.

2014/2015
At the 2014 Australian Goldfields Open, Stevens reached his first quarter-final in a year by knocking out Luca Brecel 5–3 and Fergal O'Brien 5–3, but lost 2–5 to Xiao Guodong. He was eliminated 2–6 by John Higgins in the third round of the UK Championship, but reached the last 16 of the Welsh Open by recording his first victory over Ronnie O'Sullivan in twelve years, recovering from 0–2 down to win 4–3. However, he lost 2–4 against Marco Fu in the fourth round. He was beaten in the first round of the next two ranking events, but thrashed Mark Williams 10–2 at the World Championship, before suffering a heavy 5–13 defeat to O'Sullivan in the second round.

2015/2016
Stevens was eliminated at the first round stage of the International Championship and UK Championship, before achieving his first successes at a ranking event this season when he ousted David Morris and Martin O'Donnell at the Welsh Open, winning both matches 4–2. He made three half centuries in the third round against Martin Gould, but lost 3–4. He reached the final round of qualifying for the World Championship, but was beaten 6–10 by Kyren Wilson.

2016/2017

Stevens lost 1–4 to Neil Robertson in the last 16 of the Riga Masters. At the UK Championship, he beat James Cahill 6–1, Michael White 6–4, and Joe Perry 6–2, but his run ended with a 2–6 loss to Ronnie O'Sullivan. He was knocked out 2–5 by Daniel Wells in the second round of the China Open, and failed to qualify for the World Championship for the second year in a row, after falling 8–10 to Lee Walker in the first qualifying round. His end of season ranking of 55 is the lowest he has finished a season since 1996.

2021/2022

Personal life
Stevens was born in Carmarthen, Wales. He attended an all-Welsh-speaking school, Bro Myrddin Welsh Comprehensive School, and is fluent in the Welsh language. His career took off after beating Martyn Holloway in the Regal Welsh under 16s regional tournament in Morriston. Stevens took a 2–1 victory on the black.

His father Morrell, who was also his manager, died unexpectedly in 2001. He was a close friend of Paul Hunter and was a pallbearer at his funeral. He is also a celebrity Texas hold 'em poker player and in 2004 won the UK's richest poker tournament at just 27 years old, beating 16-time World Darts champion Phil Taylor to first place. Stevens had only been playing poker for 18 months before his victory.

In 2015, Stevens was declared bankrupt and got divorced around the same time. He and his ex-wife Claire Holloway have two sons, Freddie and Ollie, who were born in 2004 and 2008 respectively.

Performance and rankings timeline

Career finals

Ranking finals: 8 (1 title)

Minor-ranking finals: 1

Non-ranking finals: 9 (8 titles)

Pro-am finals: 1

Team finals: 2 (1 title)

References

External links

 Official Site
Matthew Stevens at worldsnooker.com
 
 Profile on Global Snooker

Welsh snooker players
Masters (snooker) champions
Sportspeople from Carmarthen
1977 births
Living people
People educated at Bro Myrddin Welsh Comprehensive School
UK champions (snooker)